Laguna Yachts was an American boat builder based in Stanton, California. The company specialized in the design and manufacture of fiberglass sailboats.

The company was founded by Bill Downing in 1973.

History
The first designs produced were the Windrose 18 and the Windrose 24, both as 1974 models.

In his 2010 book, The Sailor's Book of Small Cruising Sailboats, author Steve Henkel praised Laguna Yacht's Windrose 18 in particular as "a showpiece" of Shad Turner's California sailboat design aesthetic, that emphasized "avante garde" modernist styling, something that was not seen on east coast boats in the same period.

In 1981 the company bought out Coastal Recreation Inc. of Costa Mesa, California. It continued to builder some Coastal Recreation models, adapted others into new models and ceased production of other models.

Laguna Yachts ceased business in 1986, although some of its designs were later built by Classic Yachts of Chanute, Kansas.

Boats 
Summary of boats built by Laguna Yachts:

Windrose 18 - 1974
Windrose 24 - 1974
Balboa 22 - 1977
Windrose 5.5 - 1977
Windrose 20 - 1977
Windrose 22 - 1977
Windrose 22S - 1977
Laguna 24S - 1980
Speedball 14 - 1980
Balboa 16 - 1981
Balboa 24 - 1981
Laguna 26 - 1982
Windrose 26 - 1982
Laguna 18 - 1983
Laguna 22 - 1983
Laguna 30 - 1983
Laguna 16 - 1984
Laguna 24ST - 1984
Laguna 33 - 1986

See also
List of sailboat designers and manufacturers

References

Laguna Yachts